South East Point is a point  east-north-east of Fildes Point, marking the south-eastern point of Deception Island, in the South Shetland Islands of Antarctica. It was charted by a British expedition 1828–31, under Henry Foster. The name was proposed in 1949 by the Hydrographic Department of the Admiralty, following a survey of the island by Lieutenant Commander D.N. Penfold, Royal Navy, in 1948–49.

Antarctic Specially Protected Area
The point forms part of an Antarctic Specially Protected Area (ASPA 140), comprising several separate sites on Deception Island, and designated as such primarily for its botanic and ecological values.

References

Geography of Deception Island
Headlands of the South Shetland Islands
Antarctic Specially Protected Areas